Fitchburg is an unincorporated community in Estill County, Kentucky, United States.

History
Fitchburg was named for Frank and Fred Fitch, two brothers who in 1869 started a blast furnace at the site. A post office was established at Fitchburg in 1870, and remained in operation until it was discontinued in 1955.

References

Unincorporated communities in Kentucky
Unincorporated communities in Estill County, Kentucky